Scorpion is a steel roller coaster at Busch Gardens Tampa Bay in Tampa, Florida. Built by Anton Schwarzkopf and designed by Werner Stengel, it opened on May 16, 1980, as the second roller coaster at the park. The roller coaster was added as part of the newly constructed Timbuktu section during the second-phased opening, being surrounded by the Congo and Nairobi sections.

Scorpion is one of three Silver Arrow models produced by Anton Schwarzkopf, being the only one supported on a permanent structure. Upon opening, the roller coaster received generally positive reviews and with the closure of Python in 2006, Scorpion became the oldest roller coaster at Busch Gardens Tampa Bay.

History 
Soon after the expansion of the Congo section of the park, which saw the opening of Python in the 1976 season, it was announced on May 9, 1978, by Anheuser-Busch (the initial owner of Busch Gardens Tampa) that another expansion would come to the park. The expansion was reported to begin soon after its approval, with site preparation to take place first, and cost between $5 million to $10 million. Construction of the area entitled "Timbuktu" that would encompass the latter roller coaster was observed by The Tampa Tribune in November 1978.

Anheuser-Busch announced a $12.3 million expansion to its Busch Gardens Tampa park for a new section named Timbuktu on February 5, 1979. The 7-acre (2.8 ha) addition would see the construction of several attractions, including a roller coaster entitled "Scorpion" which was described as "a European designed roller coaster with a 360-degree-loop". The Timbuktu expansion would open in two phases, with the Scorpion roller coaster to open as part of the latter-half at a later date. The original opening date was reported to be in December 1979, though, was moved back several times.

The Timbuktu section of the park opened to guests on January 25, 1980. Construction of Scorpion was observed by the Orlando Sentinel in March 1980, with an opening that was due in May 1980. On May 16, 1980, Scorpion opened as the park's second roller coaster. In 2004, the Scorpion was repainted from its original paint scheme of orange track and black supports to red track with blue supports (a paint scheme similar to SheiKra). The roller coaster is now situated in the Pantopia section of the park, which was introduced to replace the Timbuktu section with the opening of the park's drop-tower, Falcon's Fury.

Ride experience
The train exits the station forward and ascends the  lift hill. Following the drop, the trains enter the roller coaster's signature  vertical loop before exiting into a banked left turn and ascends a hill. After cresting the ascent, the trains continue left into a banked drop in its sustained turn before straightening out and ascending into a small hill going through the vertical loop. After it traverses through the middle of the loop, the train then enters a continuous series of downward spiraling helixes banked to the right before exiting and straightening out into the final brake run. The train then travels forward into a right turn on the outside of the layout, going into straight track before making another right turn into the station. One cycle of the roller coaster takes about a minute and a half to complete.

Characteristics

The roller coaster was manufactured by Anton Schwarzkopf and designed by Werner Stengel. The total cost of construction for the roller coaster ranged from $2.5 million to $3 million. Scorpion was one of three Silver Arrow model roller coasters that were produced by Schwarzkopf, which includes Big Blue located at Fun Park Biograd in Biograd na Moru, Croatia, and the other known as Looping Star owned by the Rand Show in Johannesburg, South Africa. Scorpion has a permanent support structure, as opposed to the other Silver Arrow models being portable units.

Scorpion exerts a maximum of 3.5 g-forces to its riders, and is named after the general species of scorpion. The roller coaster initially featured six-car trains that operated the layout. Scorpion operates with two trains, with five cars per train, each car is arranged two-seats across in two rows allowing for a maximum capacity of twenty riders per train. Originally the trains featured a red and orange color scheme, with the current iteration featuring a red, orange, and yellow color scheme.

Incidents 

In December 1994, the roller coaster was part of a lawsuit filed against the park that alleged a model who was employed to portray a family figure for the park's promotional material was not allowed to disembark from the roller coaster after voicing discomfort. The lawsuit alleged the park was liable for false imprisonment and negligence and sought $15,000 in damages as a result of the model's injuries as she was forced to continue riding the roller coaster several times thereafter without a break. The lawsuit was later dismissed by the judge in 1997.

Reception and legacy 

Upon opening at the park, Scorpion received generally positive reviews. Guests' reaction to the roller coaster was received well, with one group simply stating "it's a thrill." A staff writer for The Tampa Times, Dale Wilson, stated that "Scorpion looks scarier than it is," but compared the thrill of the first drop to the gliding action of a bird. Though not his favorite, as the layout was "too predictable", Wilson commented that "it'll shake you till your teeth rattle" if not holding onto the ride. A writer for the Philadelphia Daily News, Michael Knight, observed that the ride "looks like it might be the ultimate roller-coaster heart stopper." Randy Geisler, the former American Coaster Enthusiasts (ACE) president, commented that Scorpion was an intense ride and praised "how much excitement a designer can cram" within the ride's duration.

As the second roller coaster to open at the park, it was often compared to sister steel roller coaster, Python, with various preferences towards either. Python closed during the 2006 season, which made Scorpion the oldest and longest-standing roller coaster at the park.

See also 
 Colossus the Fire Dragon, another type of roller coaster model by Anton Schwarzkopf
 Kumba (roller coaster), the third roller coaster to be built at Busch Gardens Tampa Bay
 Looping Star (Nagashima Spa Land), another type of roller coaster model built by Anton Schwarzkopf
 Sand Serpent, another roller coaster situated within the Pantopia section of the park, previously part of the Timbuktu section

Notes

References

External links

1980 establishments in Florida
Busch Gardens Tampa Bay
Roller coasters in Florida
Roller coasters in Tampa, Florida
Roller coasters introduced in 1980
Roller coasters manufactured by Anton Schwarzkopf